An absorption refrigerator is a refrigerator that uses a heat source (e.g., solar energy, a fossil-fueled flame, waste heat from factories, or district heating systems) to provide the energy needed to drive the cooling process. The system uses two coolants, the first of which performs evaporative cooling and is then absorbed into the second coolant; heat is needed to reset the two coolants to their initial states. The principle can also be used to air-condition buildings using the waste heat from a gas turbine or water heater. Using waste heat from a gas turbine makes the turbine very efficient because it first produces electricity, then hot water, and finally, air-conditioning—trigeneration. Absorption refrigerators are commonly used in recreational vehicles (RVs), campers, and caravans because the heat required to power them can be provided by a propane fuel burner, by a low-voltage DC electric heater (from a battery or vehicle electrical system) or by a mains-powered electric heater. Unlike more common vapor-compression refrigeration systems, an absorption refrigerator has no moving parts.

History
In the early years of the 20th century, the vapor absorption cycle using water-ammonia systems was popular and widely used, but after the development of the vapor compression cycle it lost much of its importance because of its low coefficient of performance (about one fifth of that of the vapor compression cycle). Absorption refrigerators are a popular alternative to regular compressor refrigerators where electricity is unreliable, costly, or unavailable, or where noise from the compressor is problematic; or where surplus heat is available (e.g., from turbine exhausts or industrial processes, or from solar plants).

In 1748 in Glasgow, William Cullen invented the basis for modern refrigeration, although is not credited with a usable application. More on history of refrigeration can be found in the paragraph Refrigeration Research on page Refrigeration.

Absorption refrigeration uses the same principle as adsorption refrigeration, which was invented by Michael Faraday in 1821, but instead of using a solid adsorber, in an absorption system an absorber absorbs the refrigerant vapour into a liquid.

Absorption cooling was invented by the French scientist Ferdinand Carré in 1858. The original design used water and sulphuric acid. In 1922, two students at the Royal Institute of Technology in Stockholm, Sweden, Baltzar von Platen and Carl Munters enhanced the principle with a three-fluid configuration. This "Platen-Munters" design can operate without a pump.

Commercial production began in 1923 by the newly-formed company AB Arctic, which was bought by Electrolux in 1925. In the 1960s, absorption refrigeration saw a renaissance due to the substantial demand for refrigerators for caravans (travel trailers). AB Electrolux established a subsidiary in the United States, named Dometic Sales Corporation. The company marketed refrigerators for recreational vehicles (RVs) under the Dometic brand. In 2001, Electrolux sold most of its leisure products line to the venture-capital company EQT which created Dometic as a stand-alone company. Dometic still sells absorption fridges in 2021.

In 1926, Albert Einstein and his former student Leó Szilárd proposed an alternative design known as the Einstein refrigerator.

At the 2007 TED Conference, Adam Grosser  presented his research of a new, very small, "intermittent absorption" vaccine refrigeration unit for use in third world countries. The refrigerator is a small unit placed over a campfire, that can later be used to cool  of water to just above freezing for 24 hours in a  environment.

Principles
Common absorption refrigerators use a refrigerant with a very low boiling point (less than ) just like compressor refrigerators. Compression refrigerators typically use an HCFC or HFC, while absorption refrigerators typically use ammonia or water and need at least a second fluid able to absorb the coolant, the absorbent, respectively water (for ammonia) or brine (for water). Both types use evaporative cooling: when the refrigerant evaporates (boils), it takes some heat away with it, providing the cooling effect. The main difference between the two systems is the way the refrigerant is changed from a gas back into a liquid so that the cycle can repeat. An absorption refrigerator changes the gas back into a liquid using a method that needs only heat, and has no moving parts other than the fluids.

The absorption cooling cycle can be described in three phases:
Evaporation: A liquid refrigerant evaporates in a low partial pressure environment, thus extracting heat from its surroundings (e.g. the refrigerator's compartment). Because of the low partial pressure, the temperature needed for evaporation is also low.
Absorption: The second fluid, in a depleted state, sucks out the now gaseous refrigerant, thus providing the low partial pressure. This produces a refrigerant-saturated liquid which then flows to the next step:
Regeneration: The refrigerant-saturated liquid is heated, causing the refrigerant to evaporate out. 
The system thus silently provides for the mechanical circulation of the liquid without a usual pump.
A third fluid, gaseous, is usually added to avoid pressure concerns when condensation occurs (see below).

In comparison, a compressor based heat pump works by pumping refrigerant gas from an evaporator to a condenser.  This reduces the pressure and boiling temperature in the evaporator and increases the pressure and condensing temperature in the condenser.  Energy from an electric motor or internal combustion engine is required to operate the compressor pump.  Compressing the refrigerant uses this energy to do work on the gas, increasing its temperature. The warm, high pressure gas then enters the condenser where it undergoes a phase change to a liquid, releasing heat to the condenser's surroundings.  Warm liquid refrigerant moves from the high pressure condenser to the low pressure evaporator via an expansion valve, also known as a throttling valve or a Joule-Thompson valve. The expansion valve partially vaporizes the refrigerant cooling it via evaporative cooling and the resulting vapor is cooled via expansive cooling. (This is a combination of Joule-Thompson cooling and work done by the expanding gas, both at the expense of the internal energy of the gas) The cold, low pressure liquid refrigerant will now absorb heat from the evaporator's surroundings and vaporize.  The resulting gas enters the compressor and the cycle begins again.

Simple salt and water system
A simple absorption refrigeration system common in large commercial plants uses a solution of lithium bromide or lithium chloride salt and water.  Water under low pressure is evaporated from the coils that are to be chilled. The water is absorbed by a lithium bromide/water solution. The system drives the water out of the lithium bromide solution with heat.

Water spray absorption refrigeration

Another variant, uses air, water, and a salt water solution. The intake of warm, moist air is passed through a sprayed solution of salt water. The spray lowers the humidity but does not significantly change the temperature. The less humid, warm air is then passed through an evaporative cooler, consisting of a spray of fresh water, which cools and re-humidifies the air. Humidity is removed from the cooled air with another spray of salt solution, providing the outlet of cool, dry air.

The salt solution is regenerated by heating it under low pressure, causing water to evaporate. The water evaporated from the salt solution is re-condensed, and rerouted back to the evaporative cooler.

Single pressure absorption refrigeration

A single-pressure absorption refrigerator takes advantage of the fact that a liquid's evaporation rate depends upon the partial pressure of the vapor above the liquid and goes up with lower partial pressure.  While having the same total pressure throughout the system, the refrigerator maintains a low partial pressure of the refrigerant (therefore high evaporation rate) in the part of the system that draws heat out of the low-temperature interior of the refrigerator, but maintains the refrigerant at high partial pressure (therefore low evaporation rate) in the part of the system that expels heat to the ambient-temperature air outside the refrigerator.

The refrigerator uses three substances: ammonia, hydrogen gas, and water. The cycle is closed, with all hydrogen, water and ammonia collected and endlessly reused. The system is pressurized to the pressure where the boiling point of ammonia is higher than the temperature of the condenser coil (the coil which transfers heat to the air outside the refrigerator, by being hotter than the outside air.)

The cooling cycle starts with liquid ammonia at room temperature entering the evaporator. The volume of the evaporator is greater than the volume of the liquid, with the excess space occupied by a mixture of gaseous ammonia and hydrogen. The presence of hydrogen lowers the partial pressure of the ammonia gas, thus lowering the evaporation point of the liquid below the temperature of the refrigerator's interior. Ammonia evaporates, taking a small amount of heat from the liquid and lowering the liquid's temperature. It continues to evaporate, while the large enthalpy of vaporization (heat) flows from the warmer refrigerator interior to the cooler liquid ammonia and then to more ammonia gas.

In the next two steps, the ammonia gas is separated from the hydrogen so it can be reused.

The ammonia (gas) and hydrogen (gas) mixture flows through a pipe from the evaporator into the absorber. In the absorber, this mixture of gases contacts water (technically, a weak solution of ammonia in water). The gaseous ammonia dissolves in the water, while the hydrogen, which doesn't, collects at the top of the absorber, leaving the now-strong ammonia-and-water solution at the bottom. The hydrogen is now separate while the ammonia is now dissolved in the water.
The next step separates the ammonia and water. The ammonia/water solution flows to the generator (boiler), where heat is applied to boil off the ammonia, leaving most of the water (which has a higher boiling point) behind. Some water vapor and bubbles remain mixed with the ammonia; this water is removed in the final separation step, by passing it through the separator, an uphill series of twisted pipes with minor obstacles to pop the bubbles, allowing the water vapor to condense and drain back to the generator.

The pure ammonia gas then enters the condenser. In this heat exchanger, the hot ammonia gas transfers its heat to the outside air, which is below the boiling point of the full-pressure ammonia, and therefore condenses. The condensed (liquid) ammonia flows down to be mixed with the hydrogen gas released from the absorption step, repeating the cycle.

See also
Adsorption refrigeration
Icyball
Quantum absorption refrigerator
RV Fridge

References

Further reading

External links 
 Absorption Heat Pumps (Office of Energy Efficiency and Renewable Energy).
 Arizona Energy Explanation with diagrams
 Lithium-Bromide / Water Cycle – Absorption Refrigeration for Campus Cooling at BYU.
 

Thermodynamic cycles
Heat pumps
Cooling technology
Heating, ventilation, and air conditioning
Gas technologies
Refrigerators